Jack Townley (March 3, 1897 – October 15, 1960) was an American screenwriter. He wrote for nearly 100 films between 1926 and 1957. He was born in Kansas City, Missouri, and died in Los Angeles, California.

Selected filmography

 The Twin Triggers (1926)
 The Wright Idea (1928)
 The Cohens and the Kellys in Atlantic City (1929)
 Smart Work (1931)
 Idle Roomers (1931)
 The Tamale Vendor (1931)
 Once a Hero (1931)
 Queenie of Hollywood (1931)
 One Quiet Night (1931)
 That's My Meat (1931)
 Up Pops the Duke (1931)
 Honeymoon Trio (1931)
 The Lure of Hollywood (1931)
 Windy Riley Goes Hollywood (1931)
 Crashing Hollywood (1931)
 Three Hollywood Girls (1931)
 Hollywood Lights (1932)
 Hollywood Luck (1932)
 Bridge Wives (1932)
 Keep Laughing (1932)
 Moonlight and Cactus (1932)
 Quality Street (1937)
 The Covered Trailer (1939)
 Ice-Capades (1940)
 The Pittsburgh Kid (1941)
 Joan of Ozark (1942)
 The Yellow Rose of Texas (1944)
 Faces in the Fog (1944)
 The Last Round-up (1947)
 The Blazing Sun (1950)
 Havana Rose (1951)
 Cuban Fireball (1951)
 The Fabulous Senorita (1952)
 The Disembodied (1957)

External links

1897 births
1960 deaths
American male screenwriters
Writers from Kansas City, Missouri
Screenwriters from Missouri
20th-century American male writers
20th-century American screenwriters